Giovanni Giuseppe Brunero (10 April 1895 in San Maurizio Canavese, Piedmont – 23 November 1934) was an Italian professional road racing cyclist.

Biography
Giovanni Brunero was born in San Maurizio Canavese. He became a professional in 1920, coming fifth in Milan–San Remo. In the same year he was Italian junior champion, second at the Giro di Lombardia and he won the Giro dell'Emilia, beating Gaetano Belloni and Costante Girardengo.

In the 1920s he was one of the dominant racers in the Giro d'Italia, with victories  in 1921, 1922, and 1926. His other victories include Milan–San Remo (1922) and two Giri di Lombardia (1923–1924).

He died in Cirié in 1934.

Major results

1919
 1st  Road race, National Amateur Road Championships
1920
 1st Giro dell'Emilia
 2nd Giro di Lombardia
1921
 1st  Overall Giro d'Italia
1st Stage 7
 1st Giro del Piemonte
1922
 1st  Overall Giro d'Italia
1st Stage 7 & 10
 1st Milan–San Remo
1923
 1st Giro di Lombardia
 1st Giro della Romagna
1924
 1st Giro di Lombardia
 1st Stage 10 Tour de France
1925
 3rd Overall Giro d'Italia
1st Stage 8
1926
 1st  Overall Giro d'Italia
1st Stage 8
1927
 2nd Overall Giro d'Italia
1st Stage 13

External links

Official Tour de France results for Giovanni Brunero

1895 births
1934 deaths
Sportspeople from the Metropolitan City of Turin
Italian male cyclists
Giro d'Italia winners
Italian Tour de France stage winners
Cyclists from Piedmont